The Western Zone is a zone in the Tigray Region of Ethiopia. It is subdivided into three woredas (districts); from north to south they are Kafta Humera, Welkait and Tsegede. The largest town is Humera. The Western Zone is bordered on the east by the North Western Zone, the south by the Amhara Region, the west by Sudan and on the north by Eritrea. Prior to the 1990s, what is now the Western Zone was part of the historical province of Begemder, before being annexed into Tigray.

Since November 2020, as part of the Tigray War, the administration of the Western Zone was taken over by officials from the Amhara Region.

History 
Historically, the areas situated west of the Tekeze river were not part of Tigray. Welkait, Tsegede, Kafta Humera (now called Western Tigray) and Tselemti in the North Western Zone at times the areas were autonomous provinces ruled by Amhara nobles and other times fell under the administration of Begemder.

Zemene Mesafint (1769-1855) 

During the era of the princes, areas west of the Tekeze river was governed by an Semien based heredietary Amhara family. Ras Gebre of Semien was the governor of Semien, Tsegede, Wolkait and Wogera, his long reign lasted 44 years and came to an end in 1815. His son Haile Maryam Gebre succeeded him and reigned between 1815-1826 and was succeeded by his son Wube.

The Amhara warlord Wube Haile Maryam governed not only the western side of the Tekeze river since 1826 but also expanded into the east of the Tekeze river and conquered Tigray and areas of what is now in present-day Eritrea during the 1830's.

19th century/20th century studies 
Geographical and anthropological evidence from European scholars studying Abyssinia in the 19th and early 20th centuries characterizing Amhara and Tigray as historically separate kingdoms of Abyssinia, differing in language, dress and customs, and separated by the Tekeze River.

Examples includes 1831 publication based on Nathaniel Pearce journals during his residency in early 19th century Abyssinia, that distinguished areas west of Tekeze as separate from Tigray. Other accounts include the 1847 work of traveller Mansfield Parkyns who observed that the areas west of the Tekeze river was the boundary between Tigray and Begemder, which was similary asserted by his contemporary Walter Plowden in his posthumously published writings in 1868.

Annexation into Tigray; killings and displacement of Amharas (1990s) 
In the early 1990s, parts of Begemder province was annexed into the Tigray Region, after the Tigray People's Liberation Front-led Ethiopian alliance gained control of Ethiopia. The TPLF regime annexed the area for strategic (corridor to the Sudan) and economic (fertile land) reasons.

On May 23, 1992, the TPLF-led government admitted that there was vehement and widespread opposition from the public against the new administrative map of the regions. However, the government then launch military campaigns in Begemder, engaging in the arbitrary arrests, the killing of civilians (including elderly, women and children), and mass displacement of the population. For the TPLF, the objective was to change the demographic composition of the province.

Tigray War 

During the Tigray War, Amhara Region militias took control of most parts of the Western Zone in November 2020, which was then occupied for a duration by the joint Ethiopian and Eritrean armies.  Human Rights Watch (HRW) described this as "represent[ing] a violent reversal of changes to Ethiopia's contested internal boundaries enacted by the Tigray People's Liberation Front-led Ethiopian federal government in 1992", and after human rights abuses over many years by Tigrayan security against ethnic Amharas and Walqaytes, serving as a backdrop to the eventual violence and expulsion of Tigrayan communities. HRW further noted that the area was part of Begemder, and incorporated into Tigray province, and for decades, the TPLF led government brutally suppressed those who asserted their Amhara identity in the area.

On 17 March 2021, the Transitional Government of Tigray’s communication head, Etenesh Nigusse, claimed on VOA Tigrigna that more than 700,000 Tigrayans have been forcibly removed by Amhara forces from the Western Zone Western Tigray, further claiming that the entire population of the Western Zone now stands at around 400 000. Gizachew Muluneh, head of Amhara Regional Communication Affairs, disputed this, arguing that Etenesh's figures were too high. During the occupation, multiple atrocities were committed by Eritrean, Amara and Tigrayan forces.

Demographics 

Based on the 2007 Census conducted by the Central Statistical Agency of Ethiopia (CSA), this Zone has a total population of 356,598, of whom 182,571 are men and 174,027 women; 71,823 or 20.14% are urban inhabitants. Two largest ethnic groups reported in the Western Zone were Tigrayan (92.28%), and Amhara (6.48%); all other ethnic groups made up 1.24% of the population. Tigrinya is spoken as a first language by 86.73, and Amharic by 12.18%; the remaining 1.09% spoke all other primary languages reported. 96.25% of the population said they were Orthodox Christians, and 3.68% were Muslim.

At the time of the 1994 national census, the Western Zone included the six woredas that were split off in 2005 to form the new the North Western Zone. That census reported a total population of 733,962, of whom 371,198 were males and 362,764 females; 84,560 or 11.5% of its population were urban dwellers. The inhabitants of the Zone were predominantly Tigrayan, at 91.5% of the population, while 4.3% were Amhara, 3.5% foreign residents from Eritrea, and 0.2% Kunama; all other ethnic groups accounted for 0.5% of the population. Tigrinya was spoken as a first language by 94.45% of the inhabitants, and Amharic by 4.85%; the remaining 0.7% spoke all other primary languages reported. 96.28% of the population said they were Orthodox Christians, and 3.51% were Muslim. Concerning education in the Zone, 9.01% of the population were considered literate; 11.34% of children aged 7–12 were in primary school, while 0.65% of the children aged 13–14 were in junior secondary school, and 0.51% of children aged 15–18 were in senior secondary school. Concerning sanitary conditions, about 63% of the urban houses and 18% of all houses had access to safe drinking water at the time of the census; about 19% of the urban and 5% of the total had toilet facilities.

According to a 24 May 2004 World Bank memorandum, 6% of the inhabitants of the Western Zone Zone have access to electricity, and this zone has a road density of 23.3 kilometers per 1000 square kilometers. Rural households have an average of 1 hectare of land (compared to the national average of 1.01 and a regional average of 0.51) and an average 1.3 head of livestock. 19.9% of the population is in non-farm related jobs, compared to the national average of 25% and a regional average of 28%. Of all eligible children, 55% are enrolled in primary school, and 16% in secondary schools. 100% of the zone is exposed to malaria, and 0% to Tsetse fly. The memorandum gave this zone a drought risk rating of 533.

See also 

 Amhara genocide

Notes 

Tigray Region
Zones of Ethiopia